Camel Creek is a stream in Harding County, South Dakota.

History
Camel Creek has the name of Andy Camel, an early settler.

See also
List of rivers of South Dakota

References

Rivers of Harding County, South Dakota
Rivers of South Dakota